The 2021 Europe Top 16 Cup (also referred to as the 2021 Pomegranate Europe Top 16 Cup for sponsorship reasons) was a table tennis competition, held on 18 and 19 September 2021 in Thessaloniki, Greece, organised under the authority of the European Table Tennis Union (ETTU). It was the 50th edition of the event, and the first time that it had been held in Greece.

Medallists

Men's singles

Seeding

Players were seeded according to the latest European ranking.

Main draw

Women's singles

Seeding

Players were seeded according to the latest European ranking.

Main draw

See also

2021 European Table Tennis Championships

References

External links
ITTF website

Europe Top 16 Cup
Europe Top 16 Cup
Europe Top 16 Cup
Table tennis competitions in Greece
International sports competitions hosted by Greece
Sports competitions in Thessaloniki
Europe Top 16 Cup